Afmadow is a district in Lower Jubba of Somalia. The district capital is Afmadow. It was first established as a town in 1896.

References

External links 
 Administrative map of Afmadow District

Districts of Somalia

Lower Juba